is the name of two fictional characters in the Tekken fighting game series. The first Kunimitsu made her debut in the original 1994 Tekken game as a sub-boss for Michelle Chang as an unplayable character in the Arcade version, before being made an unlockable character in the PlayStation version. This Kunimitsu made her final canonical appearance in the Tekken series with Tekken 2. She would also appear as a playable character in the non-canon spin-off Tekken Tag Tournament and its sequel Tekken Tag Tournament 2 (initially as a pre-order bonus for the console version, and later as a free update). In Tekken 7, Kunimitsu's daughter with the same name made her debut as a DLC character, released on November 10, 2020. The second Kunimitsu is sometimes known as Kunimitsu II to distinguish her from her mother. Both Kunimitsus are female ninjas, and rivals with fellow ninja Yoshimitsu.

Appearances

Tekken series
Kunimitsu made her debut in the original Tekken as a thief and rival of Yoshimitsu. A former member of Yoshimitsu's clan, known as the Manji Clan, she was banished from the clan for her theft. In order to make ends meet, Kunimitsu enters the King of the Iron Fist Tournament to attempt to steal valuable treasure from Michelle Chang. Michelle manages to defeat her in battle.

Two years later, upon learning that Yoshimitsu's sword also holds value, she enters the King of the Iron Fist Tournament 2 to try and steal it. When she confronts Yoshimitsu in battle, she is once again defeated.

After the previous two failures, Kunimitsu decides to retire from thievery and does not participate in any more King of the Iron Fist Tournaments. Meanwhile, she gives birth to her daughter, who would also take the title of Kunimitsu.

Kunimitsu I would also appear in the non-canon games Tekken Tag Tournament and Tekken Tag Tournament 2.

Kunitmisu II first appeared in Tekken 7 as a DLC character. This Kunimitsu enters the King of the Iron Fist Tournament 7 with the same goal her mother once had: To steal Yoshimitsu's sword, in an attempt to cheer up her ill mother. She also had an undercover mission at Mishima Polytechnical School, prior to rushing back to her mother to finish what the latter started.

Design and gameplay

Kunimitsu is recognized by her fox-like mask and dagger that she carries in her hand, which she incorporates into some of her moves. Kunimitsu II dons a similar mask and also carries a dagger, but unlike the first Kunimitsu, Kunimitsu II can be customized to remove her mask. She sports two scars under each eye. In the first Tekken game, Kunimitsu was depicted as a man, but every game thereafter has depicted her as female.

Originally little more than a skin for Yoshimitsu, she gained a more unique moveset starting with the first Tekken Tag Tournament. Her fighting style is known as "Manji Ninjitsu."

Also known as Kunimitsu II, the second Kunimitsu uses the same fighting style as her mother, but with some new tweaks. Like her predecessor, she uses attacks based in kunai and kodachi. Az Elias at Cubed3 compared her fighting style to that of Kasumi from the Dead or Alive series, citing her somersaults, maneuver abilities and teleportation. In Tekken 7, she has her own stage, known as Vermilion Gates.

Reception

Kunimitsu was ranked as the 25th best Tekken character at Den of Geek by Gavin Jasper, whom opined "Kunimitsu doesn’t get nearly enough love." Tom Goulter of GamesRadar+ praised her as "...a throwback to the notion of ninja as conniving thieves and assassins, and her fleeing-and-hiding skill in particular is so finely honed..." Az Elias from Cubed3 praised her addition to Tekken 7 as "[feeling] awesome to play." She was included as an honorable mention to the five best Tekken characters by ComicBook.com, where they state "...there's something about Kunimitsu that really does something for us, whether it's her pure speed and agility, or being able to deliver thunderous combos on opponents when they don't really expect it." They also suggested her to make an appearance in the weapons-base fighting game series Soulcalibur. Prior to being added to Tekken 7, Heavy.com listed her as one of the characters they wanted to see as DLC, adding "All Tekken 7 needs to throw the [Tekken Tag Tournament 2] version of Kunimitsu into the fray, give her even more brand new maneuvers to utilize, and bless her with a bunch of flashy attires. Kunimitsu's current-gen arrival in Tekken 7 is a must at this point."

At Evo 2021, Kunimitsu was the second-most picked character in Tekken 7, after Geese Howard.

References

Female characters in video games
Fictional gymnasts
Fictional Japanese people in video games
Fictional martial artists in video games
Fictional Ninjutsu practitioners
Ninja characters in video games
Tekken characters
Video game characters who can teleport
Video game characters who can turn invisible
Woman soldier and warrior characters in video games
Video game characters introduced in 1994